In terms of linguistics and grammar, conjugation has two basic meanings. One meaning is the creation of derived forms of a verb from basic forms, or principal parts. It may be affected by person, number, gender, tense, mood, aspect, voice, or other language-specific factors. 

The second meaning of the word conjugation is a group of verbs which all have the same pattern of inflections. Thus all those Latin verbs which have 1st singular -ō, 2nd singular -ās, and infinitive -āre are said to belong to the 1st conjugation, those with 1st singular -eō, 2nd singular -ēs and infinitive -ēre belong to the 2nd conjugation, and so on. The number of conjugations of regular verbs is usually said to be four.

The word "conjugation" comes from the Latin , a calque of the Greek  (syzygia), literally "yoking together (horses into a team)".

For simple verb paradigms, see the Wiktionary appendix pages for first conjugation, second conjugation, third conjugation, and fourth conjugation.

Number of conjugations
The ancient Romans themselves, beginning with Varro (1st century BC), originally divided their verbs into three conjugations ( "there are three different conjugations for verbs: the first, second, and third" (Donatus), 4th century AD), according to whether the ending of the 2nd person singular had an a, an e or an i in it. However, others, such as Sacerdos (3rd century AD), Dositheus (4th century AD) and Priscian (c. 500 AD), recognised four different groups.

Modern grammarians generally recognise four conjugations, according to whether their active present infinitive has the ending -āre, -ēre, -ere, or -īre (or the corresponding passive forms), for example: (1)  "to love", (2)  "to see", (3)  "to rule" and (4)  "to hear". There are also some verbs of mixed conjugation, having some endings like the 3rd and others like the 4th conjugation, for example,  "to capture".

In addition to regular verbs, which belong to one or other of the four conjugations, there are also a few irregular verbs, which have a different pattern of endings. The most important of these is the verb  "to be". There also exist deponent and semi-deponent Latin verbs (verbs with a passive form but active meaning), as well as defective verbs (verbs in which some of the tenses are missing).

Principal parts 
A verb's full paradigm relies on multiple stems. The present indicative active and the present infinitive are both based on the present stem. 

It is not possible to infer the stems for other tenses from the present stem. This means that, although the infinitive active form normally shows the verb conjugation, knowledge of several different forms is necessary to be able to confidently produce the full range of forms for any particular verb.

In a dictionary, Latin verbs are listed with four "principal parts" (or fewer for deponent and defective verbs), which allow the student to deduce the other conjugated forms of the verbs. These are:
 the first person singular of the present indicative active
 the present infinitive active
 the first person singular of the perfect indicative active
 the supine or, in some grammars, the perfect passive participle, which uses the same stem. (Texts that list the perfect passive participle use the future active participle for intransitive verbs.) Some verbs lack this principal part altogether.

Regular conjugations

First conjugation 
The first conjugation is characterized by the vowel ā and can be recognized by the -āre ending of the present active infinitive form. The non-perfect tenses conjugate as follows:

In early Latin (Plautus), the 3rd singular endings -at and -et were pronounced -āt and -ēt with a long vowel.

Other forms:

Infinitive:  "to love"
Passive infinitive:  "to be loved" (in early Latin often )
Imperative:  (pl. ) "love!"
Future imperative:  (pl. ) "love! (at a future time)" 
Passive imperative:  (pl. ) "be loved!" (usually only found in deponent verbs)
Passive future imperative:  (pl. ) "be loved!" (at a future time)
Present participle:  (pl. ) "loving"
Future participle:  (pl. ) "going to love"
Gerundive:  (pl. ) "needing to be loved"
Gerund:  "of loving",  "by/for loving",  "in order to love"
 
The principal parts usually adhere to one of the following patterns:
 perfect has the suffix -āvī. The majority of first-conjugation verbs follow this pattern, which is considered to be "regular", for example:
, "to love";
 , "to order";
 , "to praise";
 , "to deny";
 , "to announce, report";
 , "to beg, pray";
 , "to prepare";
 , "to carry";
 , "to fight";
 , "to think";
 , "to ask";
 , "to save";
 , "to call";
 perfect has the suffix -uī, for example:
 , "to rub";
 , "to cut, to divide";
 , "to forbid, to prohibit";
 perfect has the suffix –ī and vowel lengthening in the stem, for example:
 , "to help, to assist";
 , "to wash, to bathe";
 perfect is reduplicated, for example:
 , "to give"
 , "to stand";

The verb  "I give" is irregular in that except in the 2nd singular  and imperative , the a is short, e.g.  "I will give".

The a is also short in the supine  and its derivatives, but the other parts of  "I stand" are regular.

Deponent verbs in this conjugation all follow the pattern below, which is the passive of the first type above:
 "to think"
 "to try"
 "to hesitate"
 "to exhort"
 "to be surprised, to be amazed at"

Perfect tenses
The three perfect tenses of the 1st conjugation go as in the following table:

In poetry (and also sometimes in prose, e.g. Occasionally the form  is also found.

Virgil has a short i for both tenses; Horace uses both forms for both tenses; Ovid uses both forms for the future perfect, but a long i in the perfect subjunctive.

The passive tenses also have feminine and neuter forms, e.g.  "she was loved",  "it was announced".

See Latin tenses.

For other meanings of the perfect and pluperfect subjunctive, see Latin tenses#Jussive subjunctive.

Other forms:

Perfect infinitive active:  "to have loved"
Perfect infinitive passive:  "to have been loved"
Perfect participle passive:  "loved (by someone)"

Second conjugation 
The second conjugation is characterized by the vowel ē, and can be recognized by the -eō ending of the first person present indicative and the -ēre ending of the present active infinitive form: 

The passive  also often means "I seem".

Other forms:

Infinitive:  "to see"
Passive infinitive:  "to be seen"
Imperative:  (pl. ) "see!"
Future imperative:  (pl. ) "see! (at a future time)" 
Passive imperative:  (pl. ) "be seen!" (usually only found in deponent verbs)
Present participle:  (pl. ) "seeing"
Future participle:  (pl. ) "going to see"
Gerundive:  (pl. ) "needing to be seen"
Gerund:  "of seeing",  "by /for seeing",  "in order to see"

The principal parts usually adhere to one of the following patterns:
 perfect has the suffix -uī. Verbs which follow this pattern are considered to be "regular". Examples:
  "to owe, be obliged"
  "to teach, to instruct"
  "to lie (on the ground/bed)"
  "to deserve"
  "to mix"
  "to warn, advise"
  "to be harmful"
  "to provide, show"
  "to hold, to keep"
  "to frighten, to deter"
  "to fear"
  "to be strong"
 perfect has the suffix –ēvī. Example:
  "to destroy"
  "to weep"

 perfect has the suffix –īvī. Example:
  "to arouse, to stir"
 perfect has the suffix -sī (which combines with a preceding c or g to –xī). Examples:
  "to burn"
  "to increase, to enlarge"
  "to stick, to adhere, to get stuck"
  "to order"
  "to remain"
  "to persuade"
  "to laugh"
 perfect is reduplicated with -ī. Examples:
  "to bite"
  "to vow, to promise"
 perfect has suffix -ī and vowel lengthening in the stem. Examples:
  "to be cautious"
  "to favour"
  "to caress, to cherish"
  "to sit"
  "to see"
 perfect has suffix -ī. Examples:
  "to reply"
  "to hiss, to creak" (also  3rd conj.)

Deponent verbs in this conjugation are few.
  "to confess"
  "to deserve"
  "to promise"

The following are semi-deponent, that is, they are deponent only in the three perfect tenses:
  "to dare"
  "to rejoice, to be glad"
  "to be accustomed"

Third conjugation 
The third conjugation has a variable short stem vowel, which may be e, i, or u in different environments. Verbs of this conjugation end in –ere in the present active infinitive.

The future tense in the 3rd and 4th conjugation (-am, -ēs, -et etc.) differs from that in the 1st and 2nd conjugation (-bō, -bis, -bit etc.). 

Other forms:

Infinitive:  "to lead"
Passive infinitive:  "to be led" (the 3rd conjugation has no r)
Imperative:  (pl. ) "lead!"
Future imperative:  (pl. ) "lead! (at a future time)" 
Passive imperative:  (pl. ) "be led!" (usually only found in deponent verbs)
Present participle:  (pl. ) "leading"
Future participle:  (pl. ) "going to lead"
Gerundive:  (pl. ) "needing to be led"
Gerund:  "of leading",  "by /for leading",  "in order to lead"

Four 3rd conjugation verbs have no ending in the imperative singular:  "lead!",  "say!",  "bring!",  "do!". Others, like  "run!", have the ending -e.

There is no regular rule for constructing the perfect stem of third-conjugation verbs, but the following patterns are used:
 perfect has suffix -sī (-xī when c or h comes at the end of the root). Examples:
  "to pluck, to select"
  "to yield, depart"
  "to close"
  "to despise, disdain, treat with contempt"
  "to say"
  "to divide"
  "to lead"
  "to bend, to twist"
  "to wear, to bear; wage (war)"
  "to send"
  "to rule"
  "to write"
  "to cover, conceal"
  "to drag, to pull"
  "to live"

 perfect is reduplicated with suffix –ī. Examples:
  "to fall"
  "to kill, to slay"
  "to run, to race"
  "to learn"
  "to cheat"
  "to fart"
  "to beat, to drive away"
  "to claim, request"
  "to touch, to hit"
  "to stretch"

Although  "to give" is 1st conjugation, its compounds are 3rd conjugation and have internal reduplication:
  "to found"
  "to entrust, believe"
  "to surrender"
  "to destroy, lose"
  "to give back"
  "to hand over"

Likewise the compounds of  have internal reduplication. Although  is transitive, its compounds are intransitive:
  "to cause to stand"
  "to come to a halt"
  "to stand off"
  "to resist"

 perfect has suffix -vī. Examples:
  "to smear, to daub" (also 4th conj. )
  "to seek, to attack"
  "to look for, ask"
  "to sow, to plant"
  "to spread, to stretch out"
  "to rub, to wear out"

 perfect has suffix -ī and vowel lengthening in the stem. In some cases, the long vowel in the perfect is thought to be derived from an earlier reduplicated form, e.g. . Examples:
  "to do, to drive"
  "to compel, gather together"
  "to buy"
  "to pour"
  "to collect, to read"
  "to leave behind"
  "to burst"
  "to conquer, to defeat"

 perfect has suffix -ī only. Examples:
  "to climb, to go up"
  "to establish, decide, cause to stand"
  "to defend"
  "to drive out, expel"
  "to strike"
  "to fear, be apprehensive"
  "to kill"
  "to show"
  "to lift, raise, remove"
  "to turn"
  "to visit"

 perfect has suffix –uī. Examples:
  "to cultivate, to till"
  "to consult, act in the interests of"
  "to beget, to cause"
  "to grind"
  "to place"
  "to weave, to plait"
  "to vomit"

 Present tense indicative first person singular form has suffix –scō. Examples:
  "to grow up, to mature"
  "to get to know, to learn"
  "to feed upon, to feed (an animal)"
  "to rest, keep quiet"

Deponent verbs in the 3rd conjugation include the following:
 "to embrace"
 "to enjoy" ( is occasionally found) 
 "to perform, discharge, busy oneself with"
 "to glide, slip"
 "to speak"
 "to lean on; to strive" ( is occasionally found)
 "to complain"
 "to follow"
 "to use"
 "to ride"

There are also a number of 3rd conjugation deponents with the ending -scor:
 "to obtain"
 "to get angry"
 "to obtain"
 "to be born"
 "to forget"
 "to set out"
 "to avenge, take vengeance on"

Deponent in some tenses only is the following:
 "to trust"

The following is deponent only in the non-perfect tenses:
 "to turn back"

Third conjugation -iō verbs
Intermediate between the third and fourth conjugation are the third-conjugation verbs with suffix –iō. These resemble the fourth conjugation in some forms. 

Other forms:

Infinitive:  "to capture, to take"
Passive infinitive:  "to be captured" (the 3rd conjugation has no r)
Imperative:  (pl. ) "capture!"
Future imperative:  (pl. ) "capture! (at a future time)" 
Passive imperative:  (pl. ) "be captured!" (usually only found in deponent verbs)
Present participle:  (pl. ) "capturing"
Future participle:  (pl. ) "going to capture"
Gerundive:  (pl. ) "needing to be captured" ( is also sometimes found)
Gerund:  "of capturing",  "by /for capturing",  "in order to capture"

Some examples are:
 "to receive, accept"
 "to take, capture"
 "to take, capture"
 "to desire, long for"
 "to do, to make"
 "to flee"
 "to throw"
 "to kill"
 "to plunder, seize"
 "to look back"

Deponent verbs in this group include:
 "to attack"
 "to go out"
 "to die"
 "to suffer, to allow"
 "to attack"
 "to go back"

Fourth conjugation 
The fourth conjugation is characterized by the vowel ī and can be recognized by the –īre ending of the present active infinitive:

Other forms:

Infinitive:  "to hear"
Passive infinitive:  "to be heard"
Imperative:  (pl. ) "hear!"
Future imperative:  (pl. ) "hear! (at a future time)" 
Passive imperative:  (pl. ) "be heard!" (usually only found in deponent verbs)
Present participle:  (pl. ) "hearing"
Future participle:  (pl. ) "going to hear"
Gerundive:  (pl. ) "needing to be heard"
Gerund:  "of hearing",  "by /for hearing",  "in order to hear"

Principal parts of verbs in the fourth conjugation generally adhere to the following patterns:
 perfect has suffix -vī. Verbs which adhere to this pattern are considered to be "regular". Examples:
  "to hear, listen (to)"
  "to guard"
  "to sleep"
  "to hinder, impede"
  "to fortify, to build"
  "to punish"
  "to know"

 perfect has suffix -uī. Examples:
  "to open, to uncover"

 perfect has suffix -sī (-xī when c comes at the end of the root). Examples:
  "to surround, to enclose"
  "to confirm, to ratify"
  "to feel, to perceive"
  "to bind"

 perfect has suffix -ī and reduplication. Examples:
  "to find, discover"

 perfect has suffix -ī and vowel lengthening in the stem. Examples:
  "to come, to arrive"
  "to find"

Deponent verbs in the 4th conjugation include the following:
 "to assent"
 "to experience, test"
 "to bestow"
 "to tell a lie"
 "to measure"
 "to exert oneself, set in motion, build"
 "to obtain, gain possession of"
 "to cast lots"

The verb  "to arise" is also regarded as 4th conjugation, although some parts, such as the 3rd singular present tense  and imperfect subjunctive , have a short vowel like the 3rd conjugation. But its compound  "to rise up, attack" is entirely 4th conjugation.

Irregular verbs

Sum and possum
The verb  "to be" is the most common verb in Latin. It is conjugated as follows:

In early Latin (e.g. Plautus),  can be found for the present subjunctive . In poetry the subjunctive  also sometimes occurs.

An alternative imperfect subjunctive is sometimes made using  etc. See further: Latin tenses#Foret.

Other forms:

Infinitive:  "to be",  "to be able"
Perfect infinitive:  "to have been",  "to have been able"
Future infinitive:  "to be going to be" (also )
Imperative:  (pl. ) "be!"
Future imperative:  (pl. ) "be! (at a future time)" 
Future participle:  (pl. ) "going to be" ( has no future participle or future infinitive.)

The present participle is found only in the compounds  "absent" and  "present".

In Plautus and Lucretius, an infinitive  is sometimes found for  "to be able".

The principal parts of these verbs are as follows:
 "to be"
 "to be away"
 "to be present"
 "to be wanting"
 "to be able"
 "to be for, to profit" (adds d before a vowel)

The perfect tenses conjugate in the regular way.

Volō, nōlō, and mālō

These verbs are not used in the passive.

Other forms: 

 Infinitive:  "to want",  "to be unwilling",  "to prefer"
 Present participle:  "willing",  "unwilling"
 Imperative: , pl.  (used in expressions such as  "don't be surprised!")

Principal parts:

 "to want"
 "not to want, to be unwilling"
 "to prefer"

The perfect tenses are formed regularly.

Eō and compounds
The verb  "I go" is an irregular 4th conjugation verb, in which the i of the stem sometimes becomes e. Like 1st and 2nd conjugation verbs, it uses the future -bō, -bis, -bit:

Other forms:

Infinitive:  "to go"
Passive infinitive:  "to go" (used impersonally, e.g.  "not knowing which way to go")
Imperative:  (pl. ) "go!"
Future imperative:  (pl. ) "go! (at a future time)" (rare)
Present participle:  (pl. ) "going"
Future participle:  (pl. ) "going to go"
Gerundive:  "necessary to go" (used impersonally only)
Gerund:  "of going",  "by / for going",  "in order to go"

The impersonal passive forms  "they go",  "they went" are sometimes found.

The principal parts of some verbs which conjugate like  are the following:
 "to go"
 "to go away"
 "to go up to"
 "to meet, assemble"
 "to go out"
 "to enter"
 "to perish"
 "to enter"
 "to die, to perish"
 "to pass by"
 "to return, to go back"
 "to go under, to approach stealthily, to undergo"
 "to be sold"

In the perfect tenses of these verbs, the -v- is almost always omitted, especially in the compounds, although the form  is common in the Vulgate Bible translation.

Ferō and compounds
The verb  "to bring, to bear, to carry" is 3rd conjugation, but irregular in that the vowel following the root fer- is sometimes omitted. The perfect tense  and supine stem  are also irregularly formed.

The future tense in the 3rd and 4th conjugation (-am, -ēs, -et etc.) differs from that in the 1st and 2nd conjugation (-bō, -bis, -bit etc.). 

Other forms:

Infinitive:  "to bring"
Passive infinitive:  "to be brought"
Imperative:  (pl. ) "bring!"
Passive imperative:  (pl. ) "be carried!" (rare)
Present participle:  (pl. ) "bringing"
Future participle:  (pl. ) "going to bring"
Gerundive:  (pl. ) "needing to be brought"
Gerund:  "of bringing",  "by /for bringing",  "in order to bring"

Compounds of  include the following:
The principal parts of some verbs which conjugate like  are the following:
 "to bring (to)"
 "to carry away, to steal"
 "to collect"
 "to put off"
 "to carry out"
 "to offer"
 "to refer"

The perfect tense , however, belongs to the verb :
 "to raise, to remove"

Fīō
The irregular verb  "to become, to happen, to be done, to be made" as well as being a verb in its own right serves as the passive of  "to do, to make".

The 1st and 2nd plural forms are almost never found.

Other forms:

Infinitive:  "to become, to be done, to happen"
Imperative:  (pl. ) "become!"

Edō
The verb  "to eat" has regular 3rd conjugation forms appearing alongside irregular ones:

Other forms:

Infinitive:  "to eat"
Passive infinitive:  "to be eaten"
Imperative:  (pl. ) "eat!"
Present participle:  (pl. ) "eating"
Future participle:  (pl. ) "going to eat"
Gerundive:  (pl. ) "needing to be eaten"
Gerund:  "of eating",  "by /for eating",  "in order to eat" / "for eating"

The passive form  "it is eaten" is also found.

In early Latin a present subjunctive  etc. is found.

In writing, there is a possibility of confusion between the forms of this verb and those of  "I am" and  "I give out, put forth"; for example,  "to eat" vs.  "to be";  "he eats" vs.  "he gives out".

The compound verb  "to eat up, consume" is similar.

Non-finite forms 
The non-finite forms of verbs are participles, infinitives, supines, gerunds and gerundives. The verbs used are:

1st conjugation:  – to praise
2nd conjugation:  – to frighten, deter
3rd conjugation:  – to seek, attack
3rd conjugation (-i stem):  – to take, capture
4th conjugation:  – to hear, listen (to)

Participles  

There are four participles: present active, perfect passive, future active, and future passive (= the gerundive).
The present active participle is declined as a 3rd declension adjective. The ablative singular is -e, but the plural follows the i-stem declension with genitive -ium and neuter plural -ia.
The perfect passive participle is declined like a 1st and 2nd declension adjective.
In all conjugations, the perfect participle is formed by removing the –um from the supine, and adding a –us (masculine nominative singular).
The future active participle is declined like a 1st and 2nd declension adjective.
In all conjugations the -um is removed from the supine, and an -ūrus (masculine nominative singular) is added.
The future passive participle, more usually called the gerundive, is formed by taking the present stem, adding "-nd-", and the usual first and second declension endings.  Thus  forms . The usual meaning is "needing to be praised", expressing a sense of obligation.

Infinitives  

There are seven main infinitives. They are in the present active, present passive, perfect active, perfect passive, future active, future passive, and potential active. Further infinitives can be made using the gerundive.
The present active infinitive is the second principal part (in regular verbs). It plays an important role in the syntactic construction of Accusative and infinitive, for instance.
 means, "to praise."
The present passive infinitive is formed by adding a –rī to the present stem. This is only so for the first, second and fourth conjugations. In the third conjugation, the thematical vowel, e, is taken from the present stem, and an –ī is added.
 translates as "to be praised."
The perfect active infinitive is formed by adding an –isse onto the perfect stem.
 translates as "to have praised."
The perfect passive infinitive uses the perfect passive participle along with the auxiliary verb . The perfect passive infinitive must agree with what it is describing in number, gender, and case (nominative or accusative).
 means, "to have been praised."
The future active infinitive uses the future active participle with the auxiliary verb .
 means, "to be going to praise." The future active infinitive must agree with what it is describing in number, gender, and case (nominative or accusative).
 has two future infinitives:  and 
The future passive infinitive uses the supine with the auxiliary verb . Because the first part is a supine, the ending -um does not change for gender or number.
 is translated as "to be going to be praised." This is normally used in indirect speech. For example:  "He hopes that he will be acquitted."
The potential infinitive uses the future active participle with the auxiliary verb .
 is used only in indirect statements to represent a potential imperfect or pluperfect subjunctive of direct speech. It is translated with "would" or "would have". For example:  (Quintilian) 'it seems unlikely that he would have told a lie, if he had not been desperate'

The future passive infinitive was not very commonly used. The Romans themselves often used an alternate expression,  followed by a subjunctive clause.

Supine 

The supine is the fourth principal part of the verb, as given in Latin dictionaries. It resembles a masculine noun of the fourth declension. Supines only occur in the accusative and ablative cases.
The accusative form ends in a –um, and is used with a verb of motion in order to show purpose. Thus it is only used with verbs like  "to go",  "to come", etc. The accusative form of a supine can also take an object if needed.
 – The father came to praise his children.
The ablative, which ends in a –ū, is used with the Ablative of Specification.
 – These arms were the easiest to praise.

Gerund  

The gerund is formed similarly to the present active participle. However, the -ns becomes an -ndus, and the preceding ā or ē is shortened. Gerunds are neuter nouns of the second declension, but the nominative case is not present. The gerund is a noun, meaning "the act of doing (the verb)", and forms a suppletive paradigm to the infinitive, which cannot be declined. For example, the genitive form  can mean "of praising", the dative form  can mean "for praising", the accusative form  can mean "praising", and the ablative form  can mean "by praising", "in respect to praising", etc.

One common use of the gerund is with the preposition  to indicate purpose. For example,  could be translated as "ready to attack". However the gerund was avoided when an object was introduced, and a passive construction with the gerundive was preferred.

Gerundive  

It means "(which is) to be ...ed". Often, the gerundive is used with part of the verb , to show obligation.

 "The boy needs to be praised"
 means "The speech is to be praised". In such constructions a substantive in dative may be used to identify the agent of the obligation, as in  meaning "The speech is to be praised by us" or "We must praise the speech".

An older form of the 3rd and 4th conjugation gerundive ends in -undum, e.g. ( for ). This ending is also found with the gerundive of  'I go':  'it is necessary to go'.

For some examples of uses of Latin gerundives, see the Gerundive article.

Periphrastic conjugations 

There are two periphrastic conjugations. One is active, and the other is passive.

Active 
The first periphrastic conjugation uses the future participle. It is translated as "I am going to praise," "I was going to praise", etc.

Passive  
The second periphrastic conjugation uses the gerundive. It is translated as "I am needing to be praised", "I was needing to be praised", etc., or as "I have to (must) be praised", "I had to be praised," etc.

Peculiarities

Deponent and semi-deponent verbs 
Deponent verbs are verbs that are passive in form (that is, conjugated as though in the passive voice) but active in meaning.  These verbs have only three principal parts, since the perfect of ordinary passives is formed periphrastically with the perfect participle, which is formed on the same stem as the supine. Some examples coming from all conjugations are:

1st conjugation:  – to admire, wonder
2nd conjugation:  – to promise, offer
3rd conjugation:  – to speak, say
4th conjugation:  – to tell a lie

Deponent verbs use active conjugations for tenses that do not exist in the passive: the gerund, the supine, the present and future participles and the future infinitive.

Semi-deponent verbs form their imperfective aspect tenses in the manner of ordinary active verbs; but their perfect tenses are built periphrastically like deponents and ordinary passives; thus, semi-deponent verbs have a perfect active participle instead of a perfect passive participle. An example:

 – to dare, venture

Unlike the proper passive of active verbs, which is always intransitive, some deponent verbs are transitive, which means that they can take an object. For example:

 – he follows the enemy.

Note: In the Romance languages, which lack deponent or passive verb forms, the Classical Latin deponent verbs either disappeared (being replaced with non-deponent verbs of a similar meaning) or changed to a non-deponent form. For example, in Spanish and Italian,  changed to mirar(e) by changing all the verb forms to the previously nonexistent "active form", and  changed to osar(e) by taking the participle  and making an -ar(e) verb out of it (note that au went to o).

Defective verbs 
Defective verbs are verbs that are conjugated in only some instances.
Some verbs are conjugated only in the perfective aspect's tenses, yet have the imperfective aspect's tenses' meanings. As such, the perfect becomes the present, the pluperfect becomes the imperfect, and the future perfect becomes the future. Therefore, the defective verb ōdī means, "I hate." These defective verbs' principal parts are given in vocabulary with the indicative perfect in the first person and the perfect active infinitive. Some examples are:

 (future participle ) – to hate
 (imperative ) – to remember
 – to have begun
A few verbs, the meanings of which usually have to do with speech, appear only in certain occurrences.

 (plur. ), which means "Hand it over" is only in the imperative mood, and only is used in the second person.

The following are conjugated irregularly:

Aio  

Present Active Participle: –

Inquam

For  

Present Active Participle – 
Present Active Infinitive – 
Supine – (acc.) , (abl.) 
Gerund – (gen.) , (dat. and abl.) , no accusative
Gerundive – 

The Romance languages lost many of these verbs, but others (such as ) survived but became regular fully conjugated verbs (in Italian).

Impersonal verbs 
Impersonal verbs are those lacking a person. In English impersonal verbs are usually used with the neuter pronoun "it" (as in "It seems," or "it is raining"). Latin uses the third person singular. These verbs lack a fourth principal part. A few examples are:

 – to rain (it rains)
 – to snow (it snows)
 – to be proper (it is proper, one should/ought to)
 – to be permitted [to] (it is allowed [to])

Irregular future active participles 
The future active participle is normally formed by removing the –um from the supine, and adding a –ūrus. However, some deviations occur.

Alternative verb forms 
Several verb forms may occur in alternative forms (in some authors these forms are fairly common, if not more common than the canonical ones):
The ending –ris in the passive voice may be –re as in:
 → 
The ending –ērunt in the perfect may be –ēre (primarily in poetry) as in:
 → 
The ending –ī in the passive infinitive may be –ier as in:
 → ,  →

Syncopated verb forms 
Like in most Romance languages, syncopated forms and contractions are present in Latin. They may occur in the following instances:
Perfect stems that end in a –v may be contracted when inflected.
 → 
 → 
 → 
 → 
 → 
 → 
 → 
 →

See also 
 Grammatical conjugation
 Latin declension
 Romance copula
 William Whitaker's Words

Bibliography 
 
Gildersleeve, B.L. & Gonzalez Lodge (1895). Gildersleeve's Latin Grammar. 3rd Edition. (Macmillan)

References

External links 

 Verbix automatically conjugates verbs in Latin.
 Latin Verb Synopsis Drill tests a user on his ability to conjugate verbs correctly.
 Arbuckle Latin Conjugator automatically conjugates and translates verbs in Latin.

Latin grammar
Indo-European verbs